Glumiflorae (gluma = husk + florae = flowers) is a descriptive botanical name. It was used in the Wettstein system for an order of flowering plants. The order consisted of one family only:

 order Glumiflorae
 family Gramineae

The APG II system, used here, assigns the grass family to the order Poales. Other names for the order including the grass family are Glumaceae and Graminales.

However, this name Glumiflorae was used in the Hutchinson system (first edition, first volume, 1926) for a taxon (above the rank of order) that included the grass family.

External links
Glumiflorae from UC Berkeley Museum of Paleontology

Historically recognized angiosperm orders